Ectopatria horologa is a moth of the family Noctuidae. It is found in the Australian Capital Territory, New South Wales, Queensland, South Australia, Tasmania, Victoria and Western Australia.

Larvae have been recorded feeding on Rhagodia parabolica.

External links
Australian Faunal Directory

Moths of Australia
Noctuinae
Moths described in 1897
Taxa named by Edward Meyrick